The  Tampa Bay Storm season was the twenty-eighth season for the franchise in the Arena Football League. The team was coached by Lawrence Samuels and played their home games at the Amalie Arena.

Standings

Schedule

Regular season
The 2016 regular season schedule was released on December 10, 2015

Playoffs

Roster

References

Tampa Bay Storm
Tampa Bay Storm seasons
Tampa Bay Storm